Buccinaria nodosa is a species of sea snail, a marine gastropod mollusk in the family Raphitomidae.

Description
The length of the shell attains 5.8 mm.

Distribution
This marine species occurs off the Solomon Islands and Papua New Guinea.

References

External links
 Morassi, M. & Bonfitto, A. (2010) New raphitomine gastropods (Gastropoda: Conidae: Raphitominae) from the South-West Pacific. Zootaxa, 2526:54-68

nodosa
Gastropods described in 2010